Nicola Faye Richards (born 19 December 1994) is a British politician who has served as the Member of Parliament (MP) for West Bromwich East since the 2019 general election. She is a member of the Conservative Party.

Early life and career
Richards grew up in Dudley. She attended The Kingswinford School in Kingswinford. and later King Edward VI College, Stourbridge for sixth form. Richards studied politics at the University of Birmingham, graduating with an upper second class degree in 2016. While at university, she was a caseworker for Dudley South MP Chris Kelly, and later for his successor Mike Wood. After university, Richards worked as a communications officer for Margot James, Stourbridge MP. Richards then worked in public relations for the Jewish Leadership Council, and the Holocaust Educational Trust.

Richards was elected as a Conservative councillor for Kingswinford North and Wall Heath on the Dudley Metropolitan Borough Council in 2015, and was re-elected in 2019. She was the chair of the local Young Conservatives group and a vice-chair of the Dudley South Conservative Association. Richards supported Brexit in the 2016 UK EU membership referendum and campaigned with Vote Leave.

Parliamentary career
Richards was elected as MP for West Bromwich East at the 2019 general election with a majority of 1,593 (4.4%).  It was a notionally safe Labour seat as it had previously elected a member of the party since its creation in 1974. Its previous MP was former deputy leader of Labour Party Tom Watson, who had stood down at the election. Richards was a member of the Women and Equalities Committee from March 2020 to November 2021 and the Education Select Committee from September 2021 to March 2022.

Richards is a supporter of transgender rights. In August 2020, she co-authored an article in ConservativeHome with fellow MP Alicia Kearns, which called on the government to reform the Gender Recognition Act 2004.

She was a Parliamentary Private Secretary in the Department of Transport between September 2021 and July 2022. Richards resigned as PPS on 5 July 2022 in protest against Prime Minister Boris Johnson's leadership over his handling of the Chris Pincher scandal.

Richards endorsed Penny Mordaunt during the July 2022 Conservative Party leadership election. After Mordaunt was eliminated, Richards backed Liz Truss.

References

External links

Living people
1994 births
UK MPs 2019–present
21st-century British women politicians
Conservative Party (UK) MPs for English constituencies
Female members of the Parliament of the United Kingdom for English constituencies
Alumni of the University of Birmingham
21st-century English women
21st-century English people
British Eurosceptics